David Earle Lopes (born May 3, 1945) is an American former second baseman and manager in Major League Baseball (MLB). He batted and threw right-handed. He played in MLB for the Los Angeles Dodgers, Oakland Athletics, Chicago Cubs, and Houston Astros; he managed the Milwaukee Brewers.

Career

Playing
Lopes was drafted by the Los Angeles Dodgers in the 2nd round of the 1968 MLB January Draft. Previously, he had played in high school at La Salle Academy and in college for Iowa Wesleyan College and Washburn University. He had previously been drafted by the San Francisco Giants in the 8th round of the 1967 MLB Draft but did not sign.

When Lopes started his career in the Dodger organization, he was an introvert, reserved and quiet. Tommy Lasorda encouraged him to assert himself more. According to Tommy John, "And as his confidence grew, Dave did just that, becoming outspoken, a catalyst, a leader. He was a guy whose blazing speed made things happen on the field and whose personality made things happen in the clubhouse. When something needed to be said to a teammate, even if it was critical, Lopes would be the guy to say it." Lasorda was also responsible for converting Lopes from an outfielder into a second baseman.

Lopes made his Major League debut for the Dodgers on September 22, 1972, against the San Francisco Giants and was 0 for 5 in that game. He recorded his first hit on a single to right field off of the Giants Jim Barr on September 24, 1972. His first home run was hit on May 13, 1973, also against Barr.

Lopes spent nine seasons with the Los Angeles Dodgers as their regular second baseman. Along with Steve Garvey (1B), Bill Russell (SS) and Ron Cey (3B), which stayed together for eight and a half seasons.

Used in the leadoff role most of his career, Lopes was one of the most effective base stealers in baseball's modern era.  His 557 career stolen bases rank 26th all-time, but his success rate of 83.01% (557 steals in only 671 attempts) ranks 3rd-best all time among players with 400 or more career stolen bases (behind Tim Raines and Willie Wilson). In 1975, Lopes stole 38 consecutive bases without getting caught, breaking a 53-year-old record set by Max Carey. Lopes' record was later broken by Vince Coleman in 1989. Lopes led the National League with 77 steals in 1975, and again with 63 the following season.

A rare blend of speed and power, Lopes hit a career-high 28 home runs in 1979, becoming one of only seven second basemen in NL history to have hit that many home runs in a season (Rogers Hornsby, Davey Johnson, Jeff Kent, Ryne Sandberg, Juan Samuel and Chase Utley are the others). He also hit 17 twice (1978 and 1983), appeared in four consecutive All-Star games from 1978 to 1981, played in one Division Series, six NLCS and four World Series, including as a member of the 1981 World Champion Dodgers.  Arguably Lopes' best World Series was against the Yankees in 1978, when he hit three home runs and seven RBIs.

Before the 1982 season, the Dodgers sent Lopes to the Oakland Athletics (for minor leaguer Lance Hudson) to make room for rookie second baseman Steve Sax.  With Oakland, Lopes teamed with Rickey Henderson to steal 158 bases, setting a new American League record for teammates. Henderson collected 130, Lopes 28.

The Athletics traded him to the Chicago Cubs on August 31, 1984, to complete an earlier deal for Chuck Rainey. He was then traded on July 21, 1986, to the Houston Astros for Frank DiPino. He stole 47 bases at the age of 40 and 25 at age 41, before retiring at the end of the 1987 season.

In a 16-season career, Lopes posted a .263 batting average with 155 home runs and 614 runs batted in in 1,812 games played. He played in four All-Star Games and four World Series.

Coaching
Following his retirement as a player, Lopes coached first base for the Baltimore Orioles from 1992 to 1994 and the San Diego Padres from 1995 to 1999. Lopes was hired as the Milwaukee Brewers manager in 2000 following Bud Selig's recommendation to hire a manager with a minority background.

In 2001 Lopes was the target of controversy following statements he made regarding stolen-base king Rickey Henderson. Managing a game for the Milwaukee Brewers, Lopes was enraged that Henderson had stolen second base in the seventh inning, while Henderson's Padres held a seven-run lead. Lopes said that this violated an unwritten rule against "showing up" the opposing team. Lopes was quoted, "He was going on his ass. We were going to drill him." However, Henderson was removed from the game.  Afterwards, Lopes said "Somebody might not be as lenient as I was, and drill the hitter that's next to him [in the lineup]."  The day after, the Elias Sports Bureau produced a list of the seven times in Davey Lopes' playing career that he had stolen a base while his team was leading by seven or more runs.

Tired of the Brewers' continued poor performance and Lopes' media and field antics, club management fired him as manager fifteen games into the 2002 season. He was 144-195 in 3 seasons with the Brewers.

Lopes rejoined the Padres as first base coach from 2003 to 2005 and then held the same position with the Washington Nationals in 2006 and the Philadelphia Phillies from 2007 to 2010.

In each of his Lopes' three seasons with the Phillies, the team led the majors in stolen base percentage, including the best in MLB history in 2007 – 87.9% (138-for-157). They finished second or third in total steals each of those seasons.

On November 22, 2010, he was named the first base coach for the Los Angeles Dodgers, a position he held through the 2015 season. On November 5, 2015, he was named the first base coach of the Washington Nationals. His contract expired after the 2017 season.

Lopes decided to retire from coaching after the 2017 season.

Statistics

Playing career

Defensively, Lopes recorded an overall .977 fielding percentage. His primary position was second base, but also played all three outfield positions, third base and shortstop. In 50 postseason games, he posted a .238 batting average (43-for-181) with 29 runs, 3 doubles, 3 triples, 6 home runs, 22 RBI, 19 stolen bases and 25 walks.

Managerial record

Personal life
Lopes was diagnosed with prostate cancer following a routine physical in February 2008.

Lopes is of Cape Verdean descent. He has a recreation center named after him in Providence, Rhode Island.

Highlights
4-time All-Star (1978–1981)
First in the All-Star Game vote (1980)
NL Gold Glove Award (1978)
Twice led NL in stolen bases (1975–76)
His career 557 stolen bases ranks him 26th in All-Time list
Ranks sixth in All-Time list with an 83.01% stolen base success rate
Ranks second in Dodgers history with 413 steals behind Maury Wills (490)
In the 1978 World Series against the Yankees, hit two home runs and drove in five runs in Game One, and added another HR in the sixth and final game.
Stole five bases in the 1981 NLCS
Stole four bases in the 1981 World Series
Set a NLCS record (since broken) with eight career stolen bases
Tied an NL record (since broken) with five stolen bases in a game (1974)

Feats
On August 20, 1974, Lopes set a club record (since broken by Shawn Green) with 15 total bases in a Dodgers 18–8 victory  against the Cubs at Wrigley Field. Lopes hit three home runs, a double and a single, as Los Angeles totaled 48 bases, also a team record.
In 1975, Lopes set an MLB record by stealing 38 consecutive bases without getting caught, breaking a 53-year-old mark set by Max Carey. Lopes' record was broken by Vince Coleman in 1989.

See also

List of Major League Baseball stolen base records
List of Gold Glove Award winners at second base
List of major league players with 500 stolen bases
List of Major League Baseball career runs scored leaders
List of Major League Baseball career stolen bases leaders
List of Major League Baseball annual stolen base leaders

References

External links

Davey Lopes at Baseball Almanac
Davey Lopes at Baseball Biography:

Davey Lopes;

Davey Lopes - Baseballbiography.com
Davey Lopes at Pura Pelota (Venezuelan Professional Baseball League)
Davey Lopes Washington Nationals Bio
The Baseball Page
Davey Lopes Los Angeles Dodgers Online
Providence RI Recreation Facility named in honor of Davey Lopes
Baseball Gauge

1945 births
Living people
20th-century African-American sportspeople
21st-century African-American people
African-American baseball players
African-American baseball coaches
African-American baseball managers
Albuquerque Dukes players
Baltimore Orioles coaches
Baseball players from Rhode Island
Chicago Cubs players
Daytona Beach Dodgers players
Gold Glove Award winners
Houston Astros players
La Salle Academy alumni
Leones del Caracas players
American expatriate baseball players in Venezuela
Los Angeles Dodgers coaches
Los Angeles Dodgers players
Major League Baseball first base coaches
Major League Baseball second basemen
Milwaukee Brewers managers
National League All-Stars
National League stolen base champions
Oakland Athletics players
People from East Providence, Rhode Island
Philadelphia Phillies coaches
San Diego Padres coaches
Spokane Indians players
Tucson Toros players
Washburn Ichabods baseball players
Washburn Ichabods men's basketball players
Washington Nationals coaches
American men's basketball players
American people of Cape Verdean descent